= German Shanghai Metro Group =

German Shanghai Metro Group (Chinese: 德沪地铁集团) was a joint venture between Shanghai Metro, Siemens AG and AEG (the railroad division now part of Bombardier Transportation) to develop railcars for the metro system.

The cars are designed in Germany and built in China.
